Antonio Hortal (born 31 December 1988) is a Spanish professional golfer. 

Hortal has played on the Challenge Tour since 2012. He picked up his first win in April 2014 at the Challenge de Catalunya in his home country, playing as an invited player.

Professional wins (1)

Challenge Tour wins (1)

*Note: The 2014 Challenge de Catalunya was shortened to 54 holes due to weather.

Team appearances
Amateur
European Amateur Team Championship (representing Spain): 2011

References

External links

Spanish male golfers
European Tour golfers
Golfers from Madrid
1988 births
Living people